John William Booth (24 April 1918 – 25 December 1999) was an Australian rules footballer who played with St Kilda in the Victorian Football League (VFL).

The son of Harold Harding Booth (1886–1964) and Susan Clara Pearl Booth, née Flowers (1891–1960), John William Booth was born at Brunswick on 24 April 1918.

Notes

External links 

Jack Booth's playing statistics from The VFA Project

1999 deaths
1918 births
Australian rules footballers from Melbourne
St Kilda Football Club players
Prahran Football Club players
People from Brunswick, Victoria